Sacha Boey (born 13 September 2000) is a French professional footballer who plays as a right-back for Süper Lig club Galatasaray.

Club career
Boey made his professional debut with Rennes in a 2–2 Ligue 1 tie with Toulouse FC on 5 May 2019.

On 26 July 2021, Galatasaray announced that a contract valid until the end of the 2024–25 season was signed with professional football player Boey.

International career
Born in France, Boey is of Cameroonian descent and eligible for both nations. He was a youth international for France in the under-17, under-18 and under-20 age groups. 

Boey was selected in the initial Cameroon squad for the 2021 Africa Cup of Nations, but was omitted from the final squad. In March 2022, Boey was included in the initial squad for Cameroon's 2022 FIFA World Cup qualification match against Algeria, but was once again omitted from the actual squad.

Cameroon manager Rigobert Song stated in September 2022 that Boey had been contacted, but that the Cameroon national team would not "wait around every day" for the player to make a decision on his international future.

References

External links

Stade Rennais Profile

2000 births
Living people
French sportspeople of Cameroonian descent
Sportspeople from Saint-Denis, Seine-Saint-Denis
French footballers
Association football fullbacks
France youth international footballers
Stade Rennais F.C. players
Dijon FCO players
Ligue 1 players
Championnat National 2 players
Championnat National 3 players
Süper Lig players
Galatasaray S.K. footballers
French expatriate footballers
Expatriate footballers in Turkey
Footballers from Seine-Saint-Denis
French expatriate sportspeople in Turkey